This is a list of years in Cyprus. See also the timeline of Cypriot history.

16th century

17th century

18th century

19th century

20th century

21st century

See also
List of years by country

 
Cyprus history-related lists
Cyprus